Semeykin may refer to:

 Semeykin (crater), impact crater on Mars
 Artyom Semeykin (born 1996), Russian football defender